William Hall Gage, 2nd Viscount Gage (6 January 1717/18 – 11 October 1791) was a British politician who sat in the House of Commons between 1744 and 1780 when he was raised to the peerage as Baron Gage. He was equerry to the Prince of Wales.

William Hall Gage was born to Thomas Gage and his wife Benedicta Maria Theresa Hall on 6 January 1717/18 and christened 31 January 1717/18 at Westminster St James, Middlesex. He was educated at Westminster School.

From 1744 Gage served five terms as Member of Parliament representing the Seaford borough of Sussex. As the eldest son, he succeeded his father to the title Viscount Gage on 21 December 1754. He served as Paymaster of Pensions from 1755 through 1763 and later from 1765 until 1782 when Parliament dissolved the office. On 3 February 1757 he married Elizabeth Gideon, the daughter of Sir Sampson Gideon. They lived at Firle Place in Firle, Sussex.

In 1780, Gage was created Baron Gage in the Peerage of Great Britain with remainder to heirs male. His wife died on 1 July 1783. Since he had no heirs male, he was again ennobled as Baron Gage of Highmeadow in the Peerage of Great Britain in 1790, but this time with special remainder to the heirs male of his brothers. Gage died 11 October 1791.

Family
William Gage's younger brother, Thomas Gage, was Commander-in-Chief of British forces at the beginning of the American Revolution. Thomas's son Sir William Hall Gage served as Admiral of the Fleet in 1862.

Gage died childless in 1791 and was succeeded by Henry Gage, 3rd Viscount Gage, the eldest son of his brother Thomas.

See also
 Viscount Gage

References

|-

1718 births
1791 deaths
People educated at Westminster School, London
Members of the Parliament of Great Britain for English constituencies
British MPs 1741–1747
British MPs 1754–1761
British MPs 1761–1768
British MPs 1768–1774
British MPs 1774–1780
William
Peers of Great Britain created by George III
Viscounts Gage